This article presents detailed opinion polling for the 2016 Hong Kong legislative election.

Overall poll results
Overall poll results for each party in geographical constituencies according to each constituency.

Opinion polling

By parties

By camps

Seat projection

By parties

By camps

Opinion polls by constituency
Key:  1 seat or  2 seats secured for anti-establishment;   1 seat or  2 seats secured for pro-establishment;  secured for non-aligned independent.

Hong Kong Island

Kowloon West

Kowloon East

New Territories West

New Territories East

District Council (Second)

Methodology
 University of Hong Kong Public Opinion Programme (HKUPOP) rolling survey was co-sponsored by HK01, now Broadband TV, Cable TV and Power for Democracy. It interviewed no less than 200 Cantonese-speaking Hong Kong registered voters of 18 years old or above each day by telephone. Telephone numbers are randomly generated using known prefixes assigned to telecommunication services providers under the Numbering Plan provided by the Office of the Communications Authority (OFCA). To ensure representativeness of the findings, the raw data collected was rim-weighted according to the age-gender distributions of registered voters in each geographical constituency based on the 2016 register of electors provided by the government.

See also
 Opinion polling for the Hong Kong legislative election, 2012

Notes

References

2016 Hong Kong legislative election
Legislative
Hong Kong